Shining Knight  is the name of multiple  fictional superheroes appearing in American comic books published by DC Comics. The original version was created by Creig Flessel and first appeared in Adventure Comics #66 (September 1941).

Fictional character biography

Sir Justin

The original Shining Knight (Sir Justin) debuted during the Golden Age and Modern Age of Comic Books and is a founding member of the Seven Soldiers of Victory.

Gardner Grayle

During DC's "Silver Age" crossover event (not to be confused with the actual Silver Age of Comic Books), Dick Giordano and Geoff Johns created a new Seven Soldiers of Victory to fight an Injustice League that had possessed the bodies of the Justice League of America.

Gardner Grayle, who would later become the Atomic Knight, took an experimental suit of armor and called himself Shining Knight for this one mission. This version of the Seven Soldiers with Batgirl, Deadman, Metamorpho, Blackhawk, Adam Strange and Mento only served in one mission and the Shining Knight armor was destroyed.

Ystina

Ystina is a reimagined character of the original created by Grant Morrison for the Seven Soldiers comic book.

Other versions

Kingdom Come
In the 1996 miniseries Kingdom Come, there is a background character named Shining Knight II. This version is more futuristic than his predecessors and comes with a giant, metal dragon named Dragonknight.

Titans Tomorrow
An older version of Ystina has appeared in Teen Titans (vol. 3) #52 as a member of the Titans Army from the Titans Tomorrow future.

JLA: Another Nail
The Shining Knight and Victory made a brief appearance in Elseworlds' JLA: Another Nail when all time periods meld together.

In other media

 Sir Justin appears in Justice League Unlimited, voiced by Chris Cox.
 Gardner Grayle appears in Black Lightning, portrayed by Boone Platt.
 Sir Justin appears in Stargirl, portrayed by Mark Ashworth.

References

External links
 
 
 
 The Shining Knight at Don Markstein's Toonopedia. Archived from the original on October 25, 2011.
 Earth-2 Shining Knight Index

Characters created by Grant Morrison
Comics characters introduced in 1941
Comics characters introduced in 2005
Arthurian characters
Arthurian comics
DC Comics fantasy characters
DC Comics titles
Fictional knights
Fictional swordfighters in comics
Golden Age superheroes
Mythology in DC Comics